Streptomyces pratens is a bacterium species from the genus of Streptomyces which has been isolated from soil from a hay meadow.

See also 
 List of Streptomyces species

References

Further reading

External links
Type strain of Streptomyces pratens at BacDive -  the Bacterial Diversity Metadatabase	

pratens
Bacteria described in 2012